Mohamed El Yousfi is a Moroccan professional footballer, who plays as a goalkeeper for Moghreb Tétouan.

International career
In January 2014, coach Hassan Benabicha, invited him to be a part of the Moroccan squad for the 2014 African Nations Championship. He helped the team to top group B after drawing with Burkina Faso and Zimbabwe and defeating Uganda. The team was eliminated from the competition at the quarter final zone after losing to Nigeria.

References

1991 births
Living people
Footballers from Casablanca
Moroccan footballers
Morocco A' international footballers
2014 African Nations Championship players
Moghreb Tétouan players
Association football goalkeepers